is a Japanese manga series written by Oji Hiroi and illustrated by Ryoichi Ikegami. It was serialized in Shogakukan's Weekly Shōnen Sunday from July 1991 to March 1992, with its chapters collected in three tankōbon volumes. In North America, the manga was licensed by Viz Media, which serialized it in their Manga Vizion magazine in 1995.

Plot
The story follows Kumomaru, a Japanese samurai who travels to Europe during the 1930s and becomes embroiled in a plot to steal the legendary Japanese sword Kusanagi. While in Europe, Kumomaru befriends Ernest Hemingway and Pablo Picasso and attempts to stop Major General Kamishima and his Nazi allies from conquering China.

Publication
Samurai Crusader is written by Oji Hiroi and illustrated by Ryoichi Ikegami. It was serialized in Shogakukan's Weekly Shōnen Sunday from July 3, 1991 to March 11, 1992. Shogakukan collected its chapters in three tankōbon volumes, released between January 1 and April 1, 1992. Media Factory re-released the manga in two bunkoban volumes on April 5 and May 2, 2003. Media Factory released a complete edition on December 22, 2006.

In North America, the series was licensed by Viz Media, which serialized it in their magazine Manga Vizion in 1995. Viz Media published the three volumes of the series between August 5, 1996 and December 6, 1997.

Volume list

Reception
In Manga: The Complete Guide, author Jason Thompson wrote: "Author Hiroi Oji (Sakura Taisen) delivers a satisfying, big-scale historical adventure story that reads like a mix between an Indiana Jones movie and a 1980s Hong Kong film. Artist Ryoichi Ikegami is in fine form throughout, with great action scenes and precise period detail. Seasoned Ikegami readers who’ve been through the torrid likes of Crying Freeman and Offered will notice that the thrills here stop just short of a PG-13 level of explicitness. Still, it’s nice to have a straightforward Ikegami adventure yarn that doesn’t require hiding the pages from plain sight from time to time." Katherine Dacey of The Manga Critic praised the series for its art, stating: "No detail goes overlooked; even the most inconsequential characters’ clothing is meticulously rendered, and the street lamps in every city are drawn with such care as to distinguish a Parisian boulevard from a Shanghai corner." Dacey however, criticized the series for its dialogues, explaining that they "feel more like policy discussions than real arguments, despite Ikegami’s best efforts to stage the scenes as dramatically as possible." Dacey concluded: "Perhaps the best way to summarize Samurai Crusader‘s appeal is to say that it has all the virtues of Crying Freeman and Wounded Man — crazy action scenes, sexy leads, mustache-twirling villains — without the copious nudity and sexual violence that can give even the most committed manga fan pause."

References

External links

Adventure anime and manga
Historical anime and manga
Oji Hiroi
Ryoichi Ikegami
Samurai in anime and manga
Shogakukan manga
Shōnen manga
Viz Media manga